Old school is a 2002 Nigerian comedy film directed by Gabriel Moses and released by Amaco Investments. It features Patience Ozokwor, Sam Loco Efe and Chiwetalu Agu.

Cast 
 Sam Loco Efe
 Chiwetalu Agu
 Ify Afuba
 Pete Eneh
 Patrick Okoye
 Patience Ozokwor
 Bob-Manuel Udokwu

Synopsis 
The film is about the funny life of a woman popularly known as Mama G.

References 

2002 films
Nigerian comedy-drama films
English-language Nigerian films